Mayerthorpe  is a town in central Alberta, Canada. The town is surrounded by Lac Ste. Anne County and is in Alberta's Census Division No. 13.

History 
The name of the post office, established in 1915, honours R. I. Mayer, the first postmaster.  "Thorpe" is from the Old English for hamlet or village.

Mayerthorpe incorporated as a village on March 5, 1927. It then incorporated as a town just over 34 years later on March 20, 1961.

On March 3, 2005, four officers serving with the Mayerthorpe and Whitecourt detachments of the Royal Canadian Mounted Police (RCMP) were killed in the Mayerthorpe tragedy.

On July 29, 2008, the Mayerthorpe Arena was destroyed by a fire.  In 2011, after three years of planning and fundraising, the new arena, now called the Mayerthorpe Exhibition Centre, was officially opened.

In 2016, a string of suspicious fires in the area resulted in the destruction of a CN trestle bridge. The bridge was rebuilt shortly thereafter, in about twenty days.

Demographics 

In the 2016 Census of Population conducted by Statistics Canada, the Town of Mayerthorpe recorded a population of 1,320 living in 540 of its 600 total private dwellings, a  change from its 2011 population of 1,398.

Media 
The local weekly newspaper serving Mayerthorpe and area is the Mayerthorpe Freelancer.

Sports 
The Whitecourt Wild Senior "AA" ice hockey team was added to the North Central Hockey League in 2013. The team plays in the Mayerthorpe Exhibition Centre.

See also 
List of communities in Alberta
List of towns in Alberta
Mayerthorpe High School

References

Further reading

External links 

1927 establishments in Alberta
Lac Ste. Anne County
Towns in Alberta